Fancy Feast is a brand of gourmet cat food from Nestlé Purina PetCare. Introduced by the Carnation Company in 1982, it was originally offered in seven flavors of wet food.

History
In 1982, Fancy Feast was introduced in 3-ounce cans of wet food in seven different varieties. It was the first "gourmet" cat food. In its original commercial, an announcer said, "Your cat give you that cold shoulder when you serve cold, leftover cat food? Watch it warm up to Fancy Feast". It also featured a white Persian cat that talked in her thoughts. It was sold along with Friskies and other pet foods in 1985 to Nestlé, and the merger became Friskies PetCare Company.

Controversy
After reports about slave labor emerged from news outlets and nongovernmental organizations related to Purina pet foods, Nestlé launched an internal investigation into the matter in December 2014. 
Their findings revealed that slave labor was present in their supply chain in Myanmar and Cambodia, where workers got trapped working on fishing vessels under inhumane conditions and for little to no pay. 
Nestlé pledged to publish yearly reports and to work with suppliers to achieve a positive difference on how they source their ingredients.

Slogans
 "Fancy Feast, darling?" (1982)
 "A moist and delicious meal in every can." (1982–1984)
 "Good taste is easy to recognize." (1982–2005)
 "Is it love, or is it Fancy Feast?" (2005–2008)
 "The best ingredient is love." (2010–present)

Products

Collectible holiday ornaments
Fancy Feast annually releases a limited-edition ornament during the Christmas holiday. The first series ornament was released in 1984.

Current products

Wet
Classic Type
 Chicken Feast
 Cod, Sole and Shrimp Feast
 Salmon and Shrimp Feast
 Seafood Feast
 Tender Beef and Liver Feast (formerly known as Beef and Liver Feast)
 Tender Chicken and Liver Feast
 Chopped Grill Feast
 Ocean Whitefish and Tuna Feast
 Savory Salmon Feast
 Tender Beef and Chicken Feast
 Tender Beef Feast
 Turkey and Giblets Feast

Marinated Morsels
 Beef Feast in Gravy
 Tuna Feast in Gravy
 Salmon Feast in Gravy
 Turkey Feast in Gravy

Roasted
 Roasted Chicken Feast
 Roasted Turkey Feast

Flaked
 Flaked Chicken and Tuna Feast
 Flaked Salmon and Ocean Whitefish Feast
 Flaked Tuna and Mackerel Feast
 Flaked Fish and Shrimp Feast
 Flaked Trout Feast
 Flaked Tuna Feast

Chunky
 Chunky Chicken Feast
 Chunky Turkey Feast
 Chunky Chopped Grill Feast
Exclusive to China

 Select Tuna Chunks Feast
 Select Tuna Meat Feast
 Select Tuna Meat with Streaks of Crab Leg and Chicken Feast
 Select Tuna Meat with Streaks of Crab Leg Feast
 Select Tuna Meat with Small Whitebait Feast
 Select Carp with Prawn Feast

References

Cat food brands
Nestlé brands
Ralston Purina products